Stigmodera sanguinosa, is a species of beetle in the family Buprestidae found throughout the southern parts of Australia.

Description
Stigmodera sanguinosa has brown elytra which are deeply pitted.  The pronotum is blackish.

Distribution
This species can be found in the southern states of Australia.

References

Buprestidae
Beetles described in 1846